Cravin' Melon is the debut EP by Cravin' Melon, released in 1995.

Track list

References

AllMusic overview

1995 debut EPs
Cravin' Melon albums